Lichtensteinia is a genus of flowering plants belonging to the family Apiaceae. It is also the only genus in the tribe Lichtensteinieae, subfamily Apioideae.

It is native to the Cape Provinces and KwaZulu-Natal (within South Africa).

The genus name of Lichtensteinia is in honour of Hinrich Lichtenstein (1780–1857), a German physician, explorer, botanist and zoologist. 
It was first described and published in Linnaea Vol.1 on page 394 in 1826.

Known species
According to Kew:
Lichtensteinia crassijuga 
Lichtensteinia globosa 
Lichtensteinia interrupta 
Lichtensteinia lacera 
Lichtensteinia latifolia 
Lichtensteinia trifida

References

Apioideae
Plants described in 1826
Flora of the Cape Provinces
Flora of KwaZulu-Natal
Apioideae genera